The following radio stations broadcast on FM frequency 93.2 MHz:

China 
 CNR Business Radio in Huaihua
 CNR Radio The Greater Bay in Foshan and Zhaoqing
 CNR The Voice of China in Tangshan

Sri Lanka
Gold FM

Turkey
Radyo 3 in Niğde

United Kingdom
BBC Guernsey (Les Touillets)
BBC Radio 4 (Ballycastle, Carnmoney Hill, Chippenham, Crystal Palace, Isles of Scilly, Penaligon Downs)
BBC Radio Cymru (Ton Pentre)
BBC Radio Scotland (Strachur)
BCfm in Bristol
Sheffield Live in Sheffield

United States
WINS-FM in New York

References

Lists of radio stations by frequency